The Inspector is an American series of 34 theatrical cartoon shorts produced between 1965 and 1969 by DePatie–Freleng Enterprises and released through United Artists.   The cartoons are dedicated to an animated version of Inspector Clouseau comically battling against a rogues' gallery of internationally-styled villains.

Outside of the episode titles, much of the humor in these shorts is derived in part from the surreality of the villains and situations, and also from the stylized animated slapstick, the brunt of which is endured by the Inspector, who is often bested by his nemeses, forcing him to face the wrath of his supervisor, the blustery and ill-tempered Commissioner (based on Herbert Lom's portrayal of Commissioner Dreyfus, if somewhat more violent) who holds him in well-deserved contempt.

Characters

The Inspector 
The Inspector is a senior detective for the Sûreté and assisted in most earlier episodes by Sergeant Deux-Deux, who is voiced by Pat Harrington Jr.;  The Pink Panther Show bumpers, he is instead voiced by Marvin Miller. Though his actual name is never mentioned, the character is clearly based on Inspector Jacques Clouseau from The Pink Panther films (to the point it's design was later reused in the opening credits of the 1968 Inspector Clouseau film, implying that both inspectors are in fact one and the same).  But in slight contrast to the completely inept live-action Clouseau, the animated Inspector is more competent, though still prone to bad luck and poor judgment.

Sergeant Deux-Deux 
The Inspector's young and timid assistant, Sergeant Deux-Deux (pronounced "Doo-Doo"), is a slow-talking Spaniard and gendarme. Like the Inspector, he is voiced by Pat Harrington Jr., and in bumpers for The Pink Panther Show, he is voiced by Marvin Miller; in "La Feet's Defeat", he is instead voiced by Don Messick, and the character is given a younger appearance and more naive personality. He frequently utters the exclamation "Jole Frijoles" ("Holy Beans") in exciting or extreme situations, and often replies to the Inspector in his native tongue, saying "Sí", only to be admonished by the Inspector who often tells him, "Don't say 'sí', say 'oui'", which sometimes leads to confusing situations between the two.   Deux Deux usually responded afterwards by intoning: "Sí, I mean oui, Inspector." In one cartoon, Deux Deux said  "ouisick" instead of "seasick".  On a couple of occasions, when the Inspector is incapacitated, Deux-Deux himself almost effortlessly manages to apprehend the culprit. He thinks of the Inspector as his hero.

The Commissioner 
The Commissioner, as his name implies, is the commissioner of the French police force and the boss of the Inspector and Sgt. Deux-Deux. The Commissioner is a heavily-built, blustery, ill-tempered, bullying, bald man dressed in a suit and a black tie. He was voiced by Larry Storch in his first two appearances, then by Paul Frees from 1966 to 1967 (sans 1967's "Canadian Can-Can", where he is voiced by Mark Skor), and by Marvin Miller in all remaining appearances. He is usually angry in his interactions with the Inspector, for instance because of the Inspector's failure to complete his missions or because the Inspector has inadvertently caused him physical harm. The short "That's No Lady - That's Notre Dame" introduces his wife (voiced by Diana Maddox) and that his real name is "Henry Vincent". Despite the Inspector's general incompetence (which the Commissioner acknowledges) the Commissioner never actually fires him, or at least not permanently.

Production 
Pat Harrington Jr. provided voices for both the Inspector and Deux-Deux; (in "La Feet's Defeat", Deux-Deux is voiced by Don Messick and sports a younger, more naive appearance.) The Commissioner was voiced by Larry Storch for his first two appearances, before Paul Frees took on the role up until "Bomb Voyage", and voiced the character one last time in "Le Escape Goat". In "Canadian Can-Can", the Commissioner is voiced by Mark Skor, who also voiced the evil face of Two-Faced Harry, the short's antagonist. The Commissioner was then voiced by Marvin Miller for his remaining appearances. Miller also assumed the role of both the Inspector and Sgt. Deux-Deux in the wraparound bumpers produced for the inaugural season of The Pink Panther Show.

The first entry in the series, The Great De Gaulle Stone Operation, preceded screenings of the 1965 James Bond film Thunderball.

The Inspector character design remained basically the same throughout the DePatie–Freleng shorts, and was used in the opening credit sequence of the 1968 live-action film Inspector Clouseau (with Alan Arkin as Clouseau), but in the opening titles of later Pink Panther features beginning in the 1970s, his look is changed dramatically to resemble Sellers, and then Steve Martin in the 2006 reboot of the series.

The theme music heard during the titles of the cartoon was the instrumental "A Shot in the Dark" by Henry Mancini, from the 1964 feature film of the same name (the second entry in the Pink Panther live-action film series). Additional music in the cartoons was composed initially by William Lava, then Walter Greene. Two shorts had their own unique arrangement of the theme music during the opening sequence, Napoleon Blown-Aparte and Cock-A-Doodle Deux Deux.

17 entries made their television debut during the inaugural season (1969–1970) of The Pink Panther Show, featuring shorter opening titles (minus credits). The remaining 17 entries appeared during the show's second season with complete theatrical opening titles.

List of shorts

1965

1966

1967

1968

1969

Cast 
 Pat Harrington Jr. – The Inspector, Sergeant Deux-Deux (except for La Feet’s Defeat - in this entry, Sergeant Deux-Deux is portrayed by Don Messick)
 Paul Frees – The Commissioner (1966–1967)
 Larry Storch – The Commissioner (1965–1966) (The Great DeGaulle Stone Operation, Napoleon Blown-Aparte)
 Marvin Miller – The Commissioner (1967, 1968–1969), The Inspector and Sgt Deux-Deux (The Pink Panther Show)
 Mark Skor – The Commissioner (1967) (Canadian Can-Can)

Home video 
A DVD containing the first 17 shorts was released on March 4, 2008 from MGM Home Entertainment/20th Century Fox Home Entertainment.

A DVD set titled Pink Panther and Friends Classic Cartoon Collection released on January 27, 2009 by MGM contains the previously-released set of the first 17 shorts and a second set of the last 17 shorts.

The first season of The Pink Panther is available for viewing on Amazon Video in the United States.

On April 26, 2016, Kino Lorber released The Inspector: The DePatie-Freleng Collection on DVD and Blu-ray - this 2-disc DVD and Blu-ray release set collects the 34 (17 for each disc) classic shorts, along with retrospective featurettes focusing on DePatie-Freleng Enterprises.

Revival 
The Inspector was revived in 1993 for the syndicated series, The Pink Panther, voiced by Brian George. The Inspector often works alongside the Pink Panther when he is depicted in law enforcement.

In other media 
A back-up feature starring the Inspector appeared regularly in The Pink Panther and the Inspector comic books published by Gold Key comics, and he also starred in his own title. He also appears in the computer game The Pink Panther: Passport to Peril, where he hires the Pink Panther to help him fight crime.

References

External links 
 Big Cartoon Database
 The Inspector at Don Markstein's Toonopedia. Archived from the original on September 17, 2016.

 
Film series introduced in 1965
Police comedies
Television series by MGM Television
DePatie–Freleng Enterprises